Willer Emilio Ditta Pérez (born 23 January 1997) is a Colombian footballer who currently plays as a centre-back for Newell's Old Boys.

Career statistics

Club

Notes

References

1997 births
Living people
Colombian footballers
Colombian expatriate footballers
Colombia youth international footballers
Association football defenders
Barranquilla F.C. footballers
Atlético Junior footballers
Newell's Old Boys footballers
Categoría Primera B players
Categoría Primera A players
Argentine Primera División players
Colombian expatriate sportspeople in Argentina
Expatriate footballers in Argentina
People from Cesar Department
21st-century Colombian people